The 2007 Asian Shooting Championships were held in Kuwait City, Kuwait between December 3 and December 13, 2007. It acts as the Asian qualifying tournament for the 2008 Summer Olympics in Beijing.

Medal summary

Men

Women

Medal table

References 
General
 ISSF Results Overview
 Results

Specific

External links 
 Official site

Asian Shooting Championships
Asian
Shooting
2007 in Kuwaiti sport
21st century in Kuwait City
Sport in Kuwait City
Shooting competitions in Kuwait